Moshulu is a four-masted steel barque, built as Kurt by William Hamilton and Company at Port Glasgow in Scotland in 1904. The largest remaining original windjammer, she is currently a floating restaurant docked in Penn's Landing, Philadelphia, adjacent to the museum ships USS Olympia and USS Becuna.

History
Originally named Kurt after Dr. Kurt Siemers, director general and president of the Hamburg shipping company G. H. J. Siemers & Co., she was, along with her sistership Hans, one of the last four-masted steel barques to be built on the Clyde. Constructed for G. H. J. Siemers & Co. to be used in the nitrate trade, at a cost of £36,000, she was launched in 1904. Her first master was Captain Christian Schütt, followed by Captain Wolfgang H. G. Tönissen in 1908 who made a fast voyage from Newcastle, Australia, to Valparaíso with a cargo of coal in 31 days.

Between 1904 and 1914, under German ownership, Kurt shipped coal from Wales to South America, nitrate from Chile to Germany, coal from Australia to Chile, and coke and patent fuel from Germany to Santa Rosalía, Mexico.

On the outbreak of World War I in 1914, Kurt was sailed to Oregon under the command of Captain Tönissen, then laid up in Astoria until being seized when the United States entered the war in 1917. She was first renamed Dreadnought ("one who fears nothing"), then, because there was already a sailing ship of that name registered in the US, she was renamed the Moshulu (which had the same meaning in the Seneca language) by the First Lady of the United States and wife of President Woodrow Wilson, Edith Wilson. Between 1917 and 1920, Moshulu was owned by the U.S. Shipping Board and carried wool and chrome between North America, Manila and Australia.

From 1920 to 1935, Moshulu was in various private hands based in San Francisco. From 1920 to 1922, it was owned by the Moshulu Navigation Co. (Charles Nelson & Co.), San Francisco; in 1922, it was sold to James Tyson of San Francisco; and, in 1922, it was repurchased by Charles Nelson. The big four-masted barque ran in the timber trade along the U.S. west coast to Australia and South Africa from 1920 to 1928.

In 1935, the Moshulu was bought for $12,000 by Gustaf Erikson. On 14 March 1935, when the contract was signed, Captain Gunnar Boman took over the ship and sailed it to Port Victoria. Gustaf Erikson had her operate in the grain trade from Australia to Europe. In 1937, John Albright sailed on her as a young seaman. During the period of Erikson ownership the working language of the ship was Swedish, even though it sailed under the Finnish flag. The ship's home port at the time, Mariehamn, is in the Swedish-speaking autonomous Finnish area Åland.

At the end of 1938, the ship left Belfast for Port Lincoln and Port Victoria, in South Australia, under the command of Captain Mikael Sjögren and with 18-year-old Eric Newby as an apprentice seaman; Newby later became a famous travel writer. Moshulu arrived in Queenstown (Cobh, Ireland) on June 10, 1939, after 91 days at sea, winning the last race of square-rigged sailing ships between Australia and Europe.

The ship was seized by the Germans in 1940 when she returned to Kristiansand, Norway, again under the command of Captain Mikael Sjögren and with a cargo of wheat from Buenos Aires. She was derigged step-by-step in the 1940s, and, after having capsized in a storm close to shore at a beach in Østervik near Narvik in 1947, she was demasted by a salvaging company to be re-erected, stabilized, and towed to Bergen in July 1948. The ship's hull was sold to Trygve Sommerfeldt of Oslo. A few months later, the ship was transferred to Sweden to be used as a grain store in Stockholm from 1948 to 1952.  Then she was sold to the German shipowner Heinz Schliewen, who wanted to put her back to use under the name Oplag as a merchant marine training ship carrying cargo. Schliewen already used the four-masted steel barques Pamir and Passat (both former Flying P-Liners) for that purpose, but before Moshulu was re-rigged, Schliewen went into bankruptcy. In 1953 Moshulu was sold to the Swedish Farmers' State Union (Svenska Lantmännens Riksförbund) of Stockholm, and again it was used as a floating warehouse beginning on 16 November 1953.

In 1961, the Finnish government bought the ship for 3,200 tons of Russian rye; she was towed to Naantali, a town near Turku, and she continued to be used as a grain warehouse.

In 1970, the ship was bought by the Specialty Restaurants Corporation, who rigged her out at Scheveningen in the Netherlands with replica masts, yards, and lines and towed her to South Street Seaport Museum, New York. The United States Coast Guard 3rd District Band rode on the Moshulu as she was towed from Brooklyn to the museum and played for the arrival ceremony on the Manhattan side of the river.  She was later towed to the Penns Landing waterfront in center city Philadelphia PA. Other sources have it that The Walt Disney Company bought the ship but soon transferred it to the American "Specialty Restaurants Corporation". Since 2003 she is operated by SCC Restaurants LLC.

In popular culture

Moshulu was made famous by the books of Eric Newby.  At the age of 19, he apprenticed aboard the Moshulu, joining the ship in Belfast in 1938 and sailing to Port Lincoln in Australia with a load of ballast stone in 82 days, a good passage for a windjammer.

Moshulu took 4,875 tons of bagged grain on board in Port Victoria and began her return voyage to Ireland in the spring of 1939. She reached her destination in 91 days, a faster passage than that of any of the other sailing ships making similar passages that year.

During the entire voyage, Newby took part in all the work required to maintain the ship, such as constant chipping of rust, painting and polishing brass and copper and overhauling the standing and running rigging – all of this on top of the day-to-day tasks required to sail the ship, such as changing from fair weather sails to storm sails and back again as storms rose and abated.

The crew at the time was predominantly Finnish and Swedish, and nationality was a source of friction amongst them throughout the voyage.

The journey was documented in Newby's books The Last Grain Race (1956) and Learning the Ropes: An Apprentice in the Last of the Windjammers (1999). The title of the former book refers to the last grain race before the outbreak of World War II. The latter contains more than 150 of the photographs Newby took while aboard.

Whilst windjammers exist and sail the seas to this day, the last windjammer carrying cargo was the Peruvian Omega (ex Drumcliff) which was in use until her loss in 1958.

Moshulu, like all grain ships, was lightly manned; during Newby's time on the ship the total crew numbered only 28, including 4 officers, the cook, the steward, and 8 sailors in each of the port and starboard watches.  Routine tasks such as wearing the ship required every crew member to be involved, meaning lost sleep for the free watch. If a sailor became ill or injured, chances were slim that he would receive treatment ashore, especially since Moshulu made no stops between Europe and Australia during Newby's voyage. When a man like Newby applied for a position in the crew, an officer had him climb to the top of the mainmast, pointing out that at sea, he might have to climb it while it was swaying wildly. For many applicants that was enough; they were never seen again.

The Moshulu was seen in the movies Rocky (shown during one of Rocky's workout sessions along the waterfront) and The Godfather Part II (seen as the young Vito Corleone arrives in America in 1901, three years before it was built), as well as in the end scene of the movie Blow Out.

See also

For examples of other large sailing ships:
List of large sailing vessels

References

Sven-Erik Nylund: Inte rädd för någon, Vasa 2001, Schildts  (in Swedish)

Further reading
Newby, Eric, The Last Grain Race, Secker & Warburg, London, 1956; Penguin Books, New York, N.Y., U.S.A., 1986.  (pbk.) 
Newby, Eric, Learning the Ropes – An Apprentice in the Last of the Windjammers, John Murray, London 1999.

External links

History of the ship from the restaurant web site

Barques
Windjammers
Grain ships
Individual sailing vessels
Tall ships of the United Kingdom
Tall ships of Germany
Tall ships of Finland
Tall ships of the United States
Four-masted ships
Ships built on the River Clyde
Restaurants in Philadelphia
1904 ships
Restaurants established in 1975
Penn's Landing
1975 establishments in Pennsylvania
Floating restaurants